Michelle Bubenicek (born 9 January 1971, in Nantes) is a French medievalist historian. She was appointed director of the École Nationale des Chartes on 1 September 2016.

Works

Books 
2002: 
2013: 
2014: 
2016: 
2016:

Pamphlet 
1996:

Awards 
 Prix Madeleine-Lenoir 2002 de la Société de l'École des chartes pour Quand les femmes gouvernent, droit et politique au XIV.

External links 
 Announcement of appointment
 Michelle Bubenicek (Université de Besançon – Franche-Comté), Femmes criminelles, femmes victimes devant la justice. Une parole au féminin ? video 
 Meurtre au donjon, Michelle Bubenicek

1971 births
Living people
Writers from Nantes
École Nationale des Chartes alumni
20th-century French historians
French women historians
21st-century French historians
French medievalists
Women medievalists
21st-century French women writers
20th-century French women writers